Gonbad-e Kavus is a city in Golestan province, Iran.

The modern name, meaning "the tower of Kavus", is a reference to the most imposing ancient monument in the city. The historic name cannot now be restored, because it was assigned to the neighboring historical city of Astarabad in the 1930s by the Iranian government. At one point, it was even known as the city of Dashte Gorgan, meaning "the Plains of Gorgan".

It is the capital of Gonbad-e Kavus County, in the province of Golestān in the northeast of Iran.  At the 2006 census, its population was 127,167, in 30,710 families.

In the historical times, the city's populations were made up of various Iranic peoples such as the ancient and eponymous Hyrcanians, Parthians and eventually the Khurasani Persians. Today, however, there are no reliable figures for the ethnic make of the city. However, it is agreed that the city has a plurality of its inhabitants being a mix of ethnic Persians, Turkmen, Turkmen remaining population are made Azerbaijanians, Sistani Persians, Baluch and other Iranic peoples.

The city is famous for its historic brick tower of the same name. The city has an ethnically diverse population and the biggest ethnic group is Persians followed by Azeris and Turkmens. The Persians and Azeris tend to mainly follow Shia Islam while the Turkmens are mostly Sunni Muslim.

Historical attractions

The "Divar-i Gorgan" (Persian for "The Great Wall of Gorgan") is a gigantic defensive wall built in the Sasanian period of Iranian history. It is one of the most outstanding and gigantic architectural monuments in northeast Iran and the most impressive in the Golestan Province. This wall, which is the largest defensive wall in the world after the Great Wall of China, starts from the Caspian sea coast, circles north of the city of Gonbad-e Kāvus, continues towards the northeast, and vanishes into the Pishkamar Mountains.

Watch towers and forts had been built at different distances. The 40 identified forts vary in dimension and shape but the majority are square fortresses. Due to many difficulties in development and agricultural projects, archaeologists have been assigned to mark the boundary of the historical find by laying cement blocks.

The Divar defensive wall has also been known variously as Alexander Dam, Anushirvân Dam, Firuz Dam and Golestan's Defense Wall in various historical texts.

Dr. Kiani, who led the archaeological team in 1971, believes that the wall was built during the Parthian dynasty, simultaneously with the construction of the Great Wall of China, and that it was restored during the Sassanid era (3rd to 7th centuries AD).

Neolithic period
During the Neolithic period, this area had many populated settlements. For example, Yarim Tepe (Iran). The Jeitun culture started before 6000 BC.

Natural attractions
 Aji gol Lake
 Ala gol lake
 Alma Gol Lake
 Chehelchay Forest
 Golestan Forest
 Gonbad Horse Racing Center

Colleges and universities
 Gonbad Kavous University
 Islamic Azad University of Gonbad
 Payamnoor University of Gonbad

Notable people 
 Sardar Azmoun
 Farhad Ghaemi
 Parham Maghsoodloo
 Magtymguly Pyragy
 Shahpour Turkian
 Mohsen Yeganeh

See also

 Decagon
 Iranian Turkmen
 Iranian Art Museum Garden, which includes a replica of the Gonbad-e Kavus tower.

Notes

References

External links

 Iran plans to begin preservation work on the tower.

Populated places in Gonbad-e Kavus County
Cities in Golestan Province
Persian words and phrases